The 1910–11 Scottish Division Two was won by Dumbarton, with Vale of Leven finishing bottom.

This season Ayr and Ayr Parkhouse merged to form Ayr United. The vacant place in Division Two was filled by Dundee Hibernian.

Table

References 

 Scottish Football Archive

Scottish Division Two seasons
2